This list of bridges in Georgia lists bridges of particular historical, scenic, architectural or engineering interest. Road and railway bridges, viaducts, aqueducts and footbridges are included.

Historical and architectural interest bridges

Notes and references 
 Notes

 

 Others references

See also 

 Transport in Georgia (country)
 Georgian Railway
 Roads in Georgia (country)
 Geography of Georgia (country)

Georgia
 
Bridges
Bridges